"Coming Home" (commonly referred to by unofficial titles such as the Folgers Incest Ad or the Folgers "Brother and Sister" Commercial) is a 2009 television commercial for Folgers Coffee. The commercial was created by the advertising agency Saatchi & Saatchi with the intention of emulating Folgers's 1980s commercial "Peter Comes Home For Christmas." The commercial became infamous after many viewers perceived that the brother-sister main characters were either engaged in or desired an incestuous relationship. The commercial inspired multiple works of fan fiction (collectively referred to as "Folgercest" or "Folgerscest"), including an entire section on the website Archive of Our Own; fan art; and parody videos.

Plot 
Writing for GQ, Gabriella Paiella described the plot as follows:

Their parents then enter the kitchen and greet the brother as the jingle "The best part of waking up, is Folgers in your cup" plays.

Background 
In 1985, Folgers released a long-running commercial called "Peter Comes Home For Christmas". In that commercial, a man named "Peter" comes home and his greeted by his younger sister, who is a little girl (as opposed to a teenager). An additional inspiration was that writer Doug Pippin's son had recently joined the Peace Corps and came home for Christmas.

Legacy 
For the ad's tenth anniversary in 2019, GQ interviewed people involved in creating the ad.

References

American television commercials
2000s television commercials
2009 television films
2009 films
2009 short films
2009 in American television
Incest in television